Spirit: Stallion of the Cimarron (also known as Spirit) is a 2002 American animated Western film produced by DreamWorks Animation and distributed by DreamWorks Pictures. The film was directed by Kelly Asbury and Lorna Cook (in their feature directional debuts) from a screenplay by John Fusco, based on an idea by Jeffrey Katzenberg, who produced the film alongside Mireille Soria.

The film follows Spirit, a Kiger mustang stallion (voiced by Matt Damon as a narrator), who is captured during the American Indian Wars by the United States Cavalry; he is eventually freed by a Lakota man named Little Creek with whom he bonds, as well as a mare named Rain. In contrast to the anthropomorphic style of animal characters in other animated features, Spirit and his fellow horses communicate with each other through non-linguistic sounds and body language (albeit with many human facial expressions and reactions).

Spirit: Stallion of the Cimarron was released in cinemas on May 24, 2002 and was a box-office disappointment, earning only $122 million on an $80 million budget. It was nominated for the Academy Award for Best Animated Feature, but lost to Spirited Away. The film also launched a media franchise using computer animation, with a Netflix spin-off television series Spirit Riding Free premiering on May 5, 2017, followed by  a spin-off of the original film, titled Spirit Untamed, released on June 4, 2021.

Plot 

In the 19th-century American West, a Kiger mustang colt, Spirit, is born to a herd of wild horses; he grows into a stallion and assumes the leadership of the herd. One night, upon following a strange light near his herd, Spirit finds horses tied to a log and their wranglers sleeping around a campfire. They awake and, after a chase, capture him and take him to a US cavalry fort.

The leader of the fort, the Colonel, orders Spirit to be broken; however, Spirit defies all attempts. The Colonel retaliates by having him tied to a post for three days without food or water. Meanwhile, a Lakota Native American named Little Creek is also brought into the fort and held captive. After three days, Spirit is weak enough that the Colonel takes control of him, boasting that any wild horse can eventually be tamed, but seeing the disappointment in the other captive horses, Spirit gets a second wind and throws him off. Humiliated and livid, the Colonel is about to shoot him before Little Creek frees himself from his bonds with a knife and saves Spirit; they escape, releasing the other horses in the process. However, Little Creek catches Spirit himself and takes him to his village.

After returning to the Lakota village, Little Creek attempts to tame Spirit with kindness, but Spirit still refuses to be broken. Little Creek ties Spirit with his mare Rain, hoping she can discipline him. Spirit eventually falls in love with Rain despite not understanding her attachment to humans. Soon, Little Creek comes to respect Spirit and realizes that he will never be tamed, and lets Spirit go. Spirit is about to return to his herd and convince Rain to come with him when he notices the Colonel and his men poised to attack the village. During the battle, at which Spirit returns to help, the Colonel shoots Rain and she falls into a river; he is about to shoot Little Creek, but Spirit knocks the Colonel off his horse, deflecting the shot. Spirit then runs after Rain in attempts to rescue her, but they both plummet over a waterfall. Spirit stays by Rain's side, only for the cavalry to recapture him but leave her for dead. Little Creek tends to Rain and vows to free Spirit.

Spirit is forced to work on the transcontinental railway, pulling a steam locomotive. After noticing that the railway will pass right through his home, Spirit quickly breaks free from the sledge and then frees the other horses. They all escape, but the locomotive crashes into another locomotive, causing an explosion that sets the forest ablaze. Spirit is trapped when the chain around his neck snags on a fallen tree. Little Creek intervenes, and together they escape.

The next morning, the Colonel and his cavalry find Spirit and Little Creek and a chase ensues through the Grand Canyon, where they get trapped on one side of a gorge. Spirit makes an incredible leap to the other side, and his bravery amazes the Colonel; he stops one of his privates from shooting Spirit, and humbly accepts defeat and leaves them be. Little Creek returns to the Lakota village with Spirit and finds Rain nursed back to health, and names the stallion "Spirit Who Could Not Be Broken". Spirit and Rain are then set loose by Little Creek; they depart to Spirit's homeland, where they reunite with his herd.

Cast 
 Matt Damon as Spirit, a Kiger mustang horse
 James Cromwell as The Colonel, leader of a cavalry of soldiers. He is based on George Armstrong Custer.
 Daniel Studi as Little Creek, a Lakota Native American whom Spirit befriends.
 Chopper Bernet as Sgt. Adams, a cavalry sergeant
 Jeff LeBeau as Murphy, the first soldier who tries to break Spirit
Jeff LeBeau also voices a Railroad Foreman
 Richard McGonagle as Bill, a wrangler 
 Matt Levin as Joe, one of the wranglers
 Robert Cait as Jake, one of the wranglers
 Charles Napier as Roy, one of the wranglers
 Zahn McClarnon as Little Creek's Friend
 Michael Horse as Little Creek's Friend
 Donald Fullilove as Train Pull Foreman

Production

Development 
Writer John Fusco, best known for his work in the Western and Native American genres (such as the films Young Guns and Young Guns II), was hired by DreamWorks Animation to create an original screenplay based on an idea by Jeffrey Katzenberg. Fusco began by writing and submitting a novel to the studio and then adapted his own work into screenplay format. He remained on the project as the main writer over the course of four years, working closely with Katzenberg, the directors, and artists.

Animation and design 
Spirit: Stallion of the Cimarron was made over the course of four years using a conscious blend of traditional hand-drawn animation and computer animation. James Baxter said that the animation was the most difficult piece of production he worked on for a movie: "I literally spent the first few weeks with my door shut, telling everyone, 'Go away; I've got to concentrate.' It was quite daunting because when I first started to draw horses, I suddenly realized how little I knew." The team at DreamWorks, under his guidance, used a horse named "Donner" as the model for Spirit and brought the horse to the animation studio in Glendale, California for the animators to study. Sound designer Tim Chau was dispatched to stables outside Los Angeles to record the sounds of real horses; the final product features real hoof beats and horse vocals that were used to express their vocalizations in the film. None of the animal characters in the film speak English beyond occasional reflective narration from the protagonist mustang, voiced by Matt Damon in the film. Many of the animators who worked on Spirit would later work on Shrek 2, as their influence can be seen for the character Donkey. The production team, consisting of Kelly Asbury, Lorna Cook, Mireille Soria, Jeffrey Katzenberg, Kathy Altieri, Luc Desmarchelier, Ron Lukas, and story supervisor Ronnie del Carmen took a trip to the western United States to view scenic places they could use as inspiration for locations in the film. The homeland of the mustangs and Lakotas is based on Glacier National Park, Yellowstone National Park, Yosemite National Park, and the  Teton mountain range; the cavalry outpost was also based on Monument Valley.
 Additional animation and fine line services were provided by Anvil Studios, Bardel Entertainment and Stardust Pictures.

Music 

The instrumental score was composed by Hans Zimmer with songs by Bryan Adams in both the English and French versions of the album. The opening theme song for the film, "Here I Am" was written by Bryan Adams, Gretchen Peters, and Hans Zimmer. It was produced by Jimmy Jam and Terry Lewis. Another song, not included in the film itself (although it can be heard in the ending credits), is "Don't Let Go", which is sung by Bryan Adams with Sarah McLachlan on harmonies and piano. It was written by Bryan Adams, Gavin Greenaway, Robert John "Mutt" Lange, and Gretchen Peters. Many of the songs and arrangements were set in the American West, with themes based on love, landscapes, brotherhood, struggles, and journeys. Garth Brooks was originally supposed to write and record songs for the film but the deal fell through. The Italian versions of the songs were sung by Zucchero. The Spanish versions of the tracks on the album were sung by Erik Rubín (Hispanic America) and Raúl (Spain). The Brazilian version of the movie soundtrack was sung in Portuguese by Paulo Ricardo. The Norwegian versions of the songs were sung by Vegard Ylvisåker of the Norwegian comedy duo Ylvis.

Release 
Spirit: Stallion of the Cimarron was released in theaters on May 24, 2002.

Home media 
Spirit: Stallion of the Cimarron was released on VHS and DVD on November 19, 2002. It was re-released on DVD on May 18, 2010. The film was released on Blu-ray by Paramount Home Entertainment, 20th Century Fox Home Entertainment and Universal Pictures Home Entertainment on May 13, 2014.

Reception

Critical response 
On review aggregator Rotten Tomatoes, Spirit: Stallion of the Cimarron holds an overall approval rating of 69% based on 127 reviews, with an average rating of 6.40/10. The site's critical consensus reads: "A visually stunning film that may be too predictable and politically correct for adults, but should serve children well." Review aggregator Metacritic gives the film a weighted average score of 52 out of 100, based on 29 critics, indicating "mixed or average reviews". Audiences polled by CinemaScore gave the film an average grade of "A" on an A+ to F scale.

Critic Roger Ebert gave the film three stars out of four and said in his review, "Uncluttered by comic supporting characters and cute sidekicks, Spirit is more pure and direct than most of the stories we see in animation – a fable I suspect younger viewers will strongly identify with." Leonard Maltin of Hot Ticket called it "one of the most beautiful and exciting animated features ever made". Clay Smith of Access Hollywood considered the film "An Instant Classic". Jason Solomons described the film as "a crudely drawn DreamWorks animation about a horse that saves the West by bucking a US Army General". USA Todays Claudia Puig gave it 3 stars out of 4, writing that the filmmakers' "most significant achievement is fashioning a movie that will touch the hearts of both children and adults, as well as bring audiences to the edge of their seats." Dave Kehr of the New York Times criticized the way in which the film portrayed Spirit and Little Creek as "pure cliches" and suggested that the film could have benefited from a comic relief character. The film was screened out of competition at the 2002 Cannes Film Festival. Rain was the first animated horse to receive an honorary registration certificate from the American Paint Horse Association (APHA).

Box office 
When the film opened on Memorial Day Weekend 2002, the film earned $17,770,036 on the Friday-Sunday period, and $23,213,736 through the four-day weekend for a $6,998 average from 3,317 theaters. The film overall opened in fourth place behind Star Wars: Episode II – Attack of the Clones, Spider-Man, and Insomnia. In its second weekend, the film retreated 36% to $11,303,814 for a $3,362 average from expanding to 3,362 theaters and finishing in fifth place for the weekend. In its third weekend, the film decreased 18% to $9,303,808 for a $2,767 average from 3,362 theaters. The film closed on September 12, 2002, after earning $73,280,117 in the United States and Canada with an additional $49,283,422 overseas for a worldwide total of $122,563,539, against an $80 million budget.

Accolades

Expanded franchise

Video games 
Two video games based on the film were released on October 28, 2002, by THQ: the PC game Spirit: Stallion of the Cimarron — Forever Free and the Game Boy Advance game Spirit: Stallion of the Cimarron — Search for Homeland.

A third game "Lucky's Big Adventure" was released in 2021 based on the "Untamed" film sequel below.

Book Series

Shortly after the movie, a book series called “Spirit of the West” was released by writer Kathleen Duey; telling the story of Spirit’s family lineage and herd.

Spin-off television series 

A computer-animated spin-off television series based on the film, titled Spirit Riding Free, premiered on Netflix on May 5, 2017. The series follows all the daring adventures when Spirit, who is the offspring of the original, meets a girl named Lucky whose courage matches his own.

Spin-off film 

A computer-animated film, titled Spirit Untamed, was released on June 4, 2021 by Universal Pictures. It is a film adaptation of the spin-off series Spirit Riding Free as well as a spin-off of the original film.

See also 

 List of animated feature films
 Kiger Mustang, the horse breed of Spirit, the protagonist of the story

References

External links 

 
 
 
 
 
 

 
2002 films
2002 animated films
2000s adventure films
2000s American animated films
2000s coming-of-age films
2002 Western (genre) films
American adventure films
American coming-of-age films
American Western (genre) films
Animated adventure films
Animated coming-of-age films
American historical adventure films
Western (genre) animated films
Annie Award winners
DreamWorks Animation animated films
DreamWorks Pictures films
Animated films about horses
Films about Native Americans
Films adapted into television shows
Films directed by Kelly Asbury
Films produced by Jeffrey Katzenberg
Films set in North America
Films set in the 19th century
Films scored by Hans Zimmer
Films with screenplays by John Fusco
Animated films about friendship
2002 directorial debut films
2000s children's animated films
Fiction about animal cruelty
Animated films about trains
2000s English-language films